Michelle Regalado Deatrick is an American politician, activist, and poet. Deatrick serves as the elected National Chair of the Democratic National Committee's Council on the Environment and Climate Crisis, which she founded in August, 2019. Deatrick also served as a surrogate and 2020 Michigan co-chair for the Bernie Sanders campaign. She served in the Peace Corps in East Africa, and as Vice Chair of the Washtenaw County Board of Commissioners. Elected to the Democratic National Committee in 2016, she was also elected Midwest Representative to the DNC Women's Caucus in 2018. Deatrick was the Special Projects Director in Michigan for the 2016 Bernie Sanders presidential campaign, and stumped for Former Secretary of State Hillary Rodham Clinton. She was a policy analyst at Stanford University. She is a graduate of Wesleyan University (Connecticut) and holds Master's degrees from Harvard University and the University of Michigan, Ann Arbor. Deatrick is also a member of UAW Local 2320 and serves as a delegate to her regional labor federation. She serves on the board of directors of the Southeast Michigan Land Conservancy. In addition to her political career, she has won several national poetry fellowships and awards.

Political career 

Deatrick serves on the Washtenaw County Environmental Council, which she founded. She was named Woman of the Year by the Women's Council of Washtenaw County in 2017. In 2016, Deatrick beat a three-term incumbent for a seat on the Washtenaw County Board of Commissioners, with 53% of the vote in the second district. Deatrick states that she supports small farms, renewable energy, veterans' services, and natural area preservation.

While serving as County Commissioner, Deatrick led measures resulting in the County being the first in the Midwest to sign on to the County Climate Coalition. She also wrote and succeeded in passing a resolution founding the County's first environmental council, with the mission of achieving net carbon neutrality for the county. She led an initiative in support of DACA recipients and ensured that a county contract with a landfill operator accounted for inflation. In May 2017, Deatrick successfully proposed anti-poverty legislation to lower the chances of residents losing their homes or facing utility shut-offs. Deatrick also wrote and succeeded in passing several measures, including: a ban on purchase of Nestle brands of bottled water by county departments in July, 2018; a statement of opposition to the Rover pipeline, a natural gas pipeline that traverses several townships in western Washtenaw County, a resolution upholding the Paris climate accord; and a resolution increasing wages for county-employed mental health workers.

As County Commissioner, Deatrick wrote and passed additional proclamations honoring the work of two Food Policy Council members, honoring county naturalist Faye Stoner, and condemning the deportation of mother and longtime community member Lourdes Salazar.

Activism 

Deatrick is an activist focusing on social and economic justice, women's issues, and climate change. In 2020, her invited speaking engagements include the American Climate Leadership Summit, the Democratic National Convention, several state Democratic party environmental caucuses, and panels with other environmental leaders.

On September 20, 2019, Deatrick spoke in an invited forum on environmental justice and politics and taught a workshop on writing Environmental Poetry at the Washtenaw County Climate Strike, part of the Global Climate Strike.

On March 16, 2019, Deatrick was lead organizer, as Chair of Women's March Ann Arbor, of Women March On for Justice.

On March 15, 2019, Deatrick was an invited speaker at the Washtenaw County Climate Strike on the University of Michigan Ann Arbor's Diag. "Climate change is an alarm clock that's been going off, ignored by those in power, for years," she said. "This strike is a beautiful thing. We have been called the grassroots for a reason - step on us, we spring back up."
 
In late 2018 and in 2019, Deatrick was a spokesperson for Michigan One Fair Wage.

In October 2018, Deatrick was co-organizer of the Stand with Survivors Rally and March in Ann Arbor, a response to the Supreme Court nomination of Brett Kavanaugh.

In January 2018, Deatrick was a lead organizer for the 2018 Ann Arbor Women's March at the University of Michigan.

In April 2017, Deatrick co-organized and spoke at the Tax March in Ann Arbor, Michigan.

In January 2017, Deatrick was a lead organizer of the Women's March in Ann Arbor, Michigan as a part of the Women's March that took place all over the world. More than 11,000 people gathered at the University of Michigan Diag and marched through Downtown Ann Arbor.

In 2014, Deatrick was involved with Michigan small farm rights, advocating for full Right to Farm protection for non-commercial farms and farms in transitional agricultural areas. Deatrick co-founded the Michigan Small Farm Council to advocate for small farming operations across the state.

Writing

Deatrick has won multiple writing awards, including both Winner and First Runner-Up in the Chautauqua Poetry Contest. Her poems have been Poem of the Week at Split this Rock, 100,000 Poets for Change Selection for their Global Day of Action and sent to President Obama by tens of thousands of poets, Second Runner-up in the Boulevard Emerging Poets Contest, Honorable Mention in The 38th New Millennium Awards, and finalists for the Rita Dove Poetry Award and the James Mitchell Poetry Award. She teaches writing privately and for the Osher Lifelong Learning Institute at the University of Michigan. She actively maintains a blog about poetry, the environment, and the 80-acre farm and native prairie she lives on and maintains. Her work has also appeared in the American Literary Review, Southern Poetry Review, the Coal Hill Review, and Crab Creek Review. Previously, her fiction was featured in Best New American Voices 2006. Deatrick has also received University of Michigan Hopwood Awards in Fiction and Poetry.

Former candidate for Michigan Senate

On August 7, 2018, Deatrick narrowly lost her primary race for the 18th district of the Michigan Senate (Ypsilanti, Ann Arbor, Saline, Milan, several townships) by 241 votes in a four-way race. She had announced her candidacy on September 7, 2017. As a progressive Democratic candidate, Deatrick was endorsed by multiple left-leaning organizations. She also received distinctions from Planned Parenthood as a candidate with a 100% favorable rating and as a Moms Demand Action Gun Sense Candidate. Her progressive platform includes gun control, increased public education funding, universal single-payer health care, environmental cleanliness, road and infrastructure repair, care and rights for seniors, veterans' services, removing corruption from politics, criminal justice reform, and equality and representation for women, people of color, immigrants, people with disabilities, and the LGBTQ+ community.

Education 
Deatrick holds a BA from Wesleyan University, a Master's Degree in Education Policy and Administration from Harvard, and an MFA in creative writing from the University of Michigan. She did further graduate work at Stanford University and is ABD on a PhD in Education and Political Science.

References

External links
Personal website
Campaign Facebook Page

Living people
American women poets
Wesleyan University alumni
Harvard Graduate School of Education alumni
University of Michigan alumni
Poets from Michigan
County commissioners in Michigan
Women in Michigan politics
Michigan Democrats
Year of birth missing (living people)
21st-century American women